The 1962 United States Senate election in Kentucky took place on November 6, 1962. Incumbent Republican Senator Thruston Ballard Morton won re-election to a second term.

Primary elections
Primary elections were held on May 29, 1962.

Democratic primary

Candidates
James L. Delk, perennial candidate
Marion Vance, attorney
Wilson W. Wyatt, incumbent Lieutenant Governor of Kentucky

Results

Republican primary

Candidates
Thurman Jerome Hamlin, perennial candidate
Thruston Ballard Morton, incumbent U.S. Senator

Results

General election

Results

See also 
 1962 United States Senate elections

References

Bibliography
 
 

1962
Kentucky
United States Senate